Zarajec  is a village in the administrative district of Gmina Modliborzyce, in the Janów Lubelski County, Lublin Voivodeship, in eastern Poland.

References

Zarajec